This is an alphabetical index of topics related to Hispanic and Latino Americans.

A
 Aztlán

B
 Bisbee Deportation
 Bracero program
 Brown Berets

C
 Católicos por La Raza
 Chicana feminism
 Chicanismo
 Chicano art
 Chicano Blowouts
 Chicano films
 Chicano literature
 Chicano Moratorium
 Chicano Movement
 Chicano poetry
 Chicano Park
 Chicano rock
 Chicano rap
 Cholo
 Colegio César Chávez

E
 Estrada Courts murals

L
 Las Gorras Blancas
 Lowrider

M
 Mexican muralism
 Mexican Repatriation

N
 New Mexican cuisine
 New Mexico music

O
 Operation Wetback

P
 Pachuco
 Paño
 Plan de Santa Bárbara
 Plan Espiritual de Aztlán
 Proposition 187

S
 Skull art
 Sleepy Lagoon murder

T
 Teatro Campesino
 Tejano music
 Tex-Mex cuisine
 Tortilla art

Z
 Zoot suit
 Zoot Suit Riots

References 

Hispanic and Latino American
Latino-American-related topics